Nemanja Mladenović (born 3 March 1993) is a Serbian professional footballer who plays for Novi Pazar.

Club career

Kolubara
Born in Valjevo, Mladenović passed the youth school of OFK Beograd, and he was called to youth national selections as a member of a team from Karaburma. He moved to Kolubara in 2012 and that year he made 30 appearances, including 29 league and 1 cup match, and scored 1 goal.

Metalac Gornji Milanovac
Mladenović joined FK Metalac Gornji Milanovac on the beginning of 2013. He made 13 Serbian First League appearances until the end of 2012–13 season. For the 2013–14 season, Mladenović made 18 league appearances with 2 goals, and also played in a cup match against Partizan and play-off match against Rad. In 2014–15 season, Mladenović was the most standard player, playing all season matches, he scored 3 goals on 30 Serbian First League appearances, and also had 2 cup appearances and 2 play-off matches against Napredak Kruševac, after then Metalac promoted in Serbian SuperLiga. Mladenović made his SuperLiga debut in the first fixture of 2015–16 season, against Partizan. Mladenović scored his first goal for the 2016–17 season in a match against Red Star Belgrade on 29 July 2016, 15 minutes after he replaced Milan Stojanović in second half of the match.

Bodø/Glimt
On 26 January 2017, Mladenović signed with Bodø/Glimt. Mladenović scored his first goal on a debut match for new team, in 5–0 victory over Elverum on 17 April 2017. Several days later, on 26 April, he also scored Norwegian Football Cup match against Fauske/Sprint. Making 6 appearances with 2 goals in both Norwegian domestic competitions, Mladenović terminated a contract with the club and left as a free agent at the beginning of August same year.

Zemun
Mladenović returned to the Serbian side Zemun in summer 2017. He scored a goal and made an assist to Dejan Đenić on his debut match for 2–0 victory over Čukarički, after which he was elected for a player of the week in the Serbian SuperLiga. During the first half-season, Mladenović collected 18 matches at total in botn domestic competitions. In last days of December 2017, both sides mutually terminated the contract and Mladenović the club in the mid-season.

AEL
In late 2017, it was announced about Mladenović's moving to AEL. He officially promoted in new club on 3 January 2018, penning two-and-a-half year deal, along with fellow countryman Radomir Milosavljević and Bulgarian defender Hristofor Hubchev. Mladenović made his competitive debut for AEL on 14 January 2018, replacing Adnan Aganović in 3–1 defeat against Asteras Tripolis. Mladenović made his first start in 26th week of the 2017–18 Superleague Greece campaign, Apollon Smyrni. While with the club, Mladenović archived 11 league caps, mostly as a back-up, and also spent both of matches against PAS Giannina in quarterfinal of the Greek Football Cup as an unused substitution.

OFK Bačka
Returning to Serbia, Mladenović rejoined Zemun and started training with the club on 11 June 2018. Later, same month, Mladenović moved to OFK Bačka and signed one-year contract with new club. Ending of November 2018, Mladenović mutually terminated the contract and left the club as a free agent.

Spartak Subotica
On 15 January 2019, Mladenović joined Spartak Subotica.

International career
Mladenović was called into the Serbia u19 team, making 8 appearances with 2 goals between 2011 and 2012. As a selector of Serbia u23, Milan Rastavac invited Mladenović in the squad for a friendly match on 22 December 2015, when he made his debut for the team scoring a goal in 3-0 victory over Qatar.

Career statistics

References

External links
 Nemanja Mladenović stats at utakmica.rs 
 
 
 

1993 births
Living people
Sportspeople from Valjevo
Association football midfielders
Serbian footballers
Serbian expatriate footballers
FK Kolubara players
FK Metalac Gornji Milanovac players
FK Zemun players
OFK Bačka players
FK Spartak Subotica players
FK Bodø/Glimt players
Athlitiki Enosi Larissa F.C. players
FK Javor Ivanjica players
FK Rad players
FK Novi Pazar players
Serbian First League players
Serbian SuperLiga players
Norwegian First Division players
Super League Greece players
Serbian expatriate sportspeople in Norway
Serbian expatriate sportspeople in Greece
Expatriate footballers in Norway
Expatriate footballers in Greece